Eyshabad (also Romanized as ‘Eyshābād; also known as Eshavand and Eshavat) is a village in Mishab-e Shomali Rural District, in the Central District of Marand County, East Azerbaijan Province, Iran. At the 2006 census, its population was 339, in 103 families.

References 

Populated places in Marand County